Muricauda lutimaris is a Gram-negative, rod-shaped and non-motile bacterium from the genus of Muricauda which has been isolated from tidal flat from the Yellow Sea in Korea.

References

External links
Type strain of Muricauda lutimaris at BacDive -  the Bacterial Diversity Metadatabase

Further reading 
 
 

Flavobacteria
Bacteria described in 2008